Khan Kandi (also Romanized as Khān Kandī) is a village in Seyyedan Rural District, Abish Ahmad District, Kaleybar County, East Azerbaijan Province, Iran. At the 2006 census, its population was 221, in 52 families.

References 

Populated places in Kaleybar County